Clyde Austin Drexler (born June 22, 1962) is an American former professional basketball player and the commissioner of the Big3 3-on-3 basketball league. Nicknamed "Clyde the Glide", he played 15 seasons in the National Basketball Association (NBA), spending a majority of his career with the Portland Trail Blazers before finishing with the Houston Rockets. He was a ten-time NBA All-Star and named to the NBA's 50th and 75th anniversary teams. Drexler won an NBA championship with Houston in 1995, and earned a gold medal on the 1992 United States Olympic team known as "The Dream Team". He was inducted twice into the Naismith Memorial Basketball Hall of Fame, in 2004 for his individual career and in 2010 as a member of the "Dream Team". Drexler is widely considered one of the greatest basketball players and greatest shooting guards of all time.

Early years
Drexler was born in New Orleans, Louisiana, and lived in the South Park area in Houston, Texas. He attended Ross Sterling High School in Houston, where he was a classmate of tennis player Zina Garrison. As a sophomore, he made the varsity baseball team, and tried out for the basketball team but failed to make the cut. Drexler played as a  center as a senior. He began receiving attention from college coaches following a 34-point, 27-rebound performance against Sharpstown High School during a 1979 Christmas tournament.

After graduating in 1980, he was recruited by New Mexico State University, Texas Tech University, and the University of Houston, the latter after childhood friend Michael Young told an assistant to head coach Guy Lewis that Drexler was the best player he had faced in high school. Houston was able to recruit them both due to Drexler's friendship with Young and his desire to stay home. Drexler majored in finance and worked at a bank during the summer. Lewis recalled in 2003 that he initially received hate mail from Houston supporters and alumni for recruiting Drexler, as they felt that he was not good enough to play for the school.

College career

Drexler and Young, along with Larry Micheaux and new recruit Hakeem Olajuwon (known then as Akeem), comprised the "Phi Slama Jama" basketball fraternity that gained national attention for its acrobatic, above-the-rim play. New players were "initiated" into the fraternity by having to stand underneath the basket as Drexler drove in from halfcourt and threw down a tomahawk slam over them. Houston made the first of Drexler's two straight Final Four appearances in 1982, where they lost to eventual champions North Carolina. He averaged 15.2 points and 10.5 rebounds (second in the Southwest Conference) per game as a small forward as Houston finished 25–8.

The 1982–83 campaign saw Houston return to the Final Four ranked No. 1. They were matched up against No. 2 Louisville and the "Doctors of Dunk" in the semifinals, which Houston won 94–81 following a brilliant dunking display by both sides, including a double-pump slam by Drexler that Sports Illustrated writer Curry Kirkpatrick called "your basic play of the century". He finished with 21 points, seven rebounds and six assists. In the championship game against North Carolina State, Drexler failed to make an impact after picking up four fouls before halftime, and scored only four points on one-of-five shooting and two free throws in NC State's upset victory.

Drexler declared for the NBA draft as a junior, leaving Houston with career averages of 14.4 points, 3.3 assists and 9.9 rebounds in three seasons. In addition to being named the Southwestern Conference Player of the Year and a first-team All American his final season, he remains the only player in school history with combined totals of at least 1,000 career points, 900 rebounds and 300 assists; he is also Houston's all-time steals leader with 268.

NBA career

Portland Trail Blazers (1983–1995) 
In the 1983 NBA draft, Drexler was selected by the Portland Trail Blazers with the 14th overall pick. He averaged 7.7 points in 17.2 minutes per game in his rookie season. These all improved with more playing time in his second season, to 17.2 points, 6 rebounds, 5.5 assists and 2.2 steals per game. In his third season Drexler made his first All-Star team, averaging 18.5 points, 5.6 rebounds, 8 assists and 2.6 steals. On January 6, 1989, Drexler scored a career-high 50 points during a double-overtime win over the Sacramento Kings. In the 1989–1990 season, Drexler led the Portland Trail Blazers to the 1990 NBA Finals, averaging 26.4 points, 7.8 rebounds and 6.2 assists, but his team lost to the Detroit Pistons in five games. In the 1990–1991 season Drexler led Portland to a franchise-best 63–19 record. Heavily favored to win the West, the Los Angeles Lakers upset the Trail Blazers by winning the Western Conference Finals.

In the 1991–92 season he made the All-NBA First Team and finished second to Michael Jordan in MVP voting. He met Jordan's Chicago Bulls in the 1992 NBA Finals that same season only to fall short, as Jordan and the Bulls went on to win their second consecutive championship. In Game 3 of the series, Drexler led all scorers with 32 points during a 94–84 loss. In the six-game series against Chicago, Drexler averaged 24.8 points, 7.8 rebounds and 5.3 assists per game.

In 1992, he was selected to the U.S. Olympic basketball team, nicknamed "The Dream Team", which won the gold medal in Barcelona.

Houston Rockets (1995–1998) 
On February 14, 1995, with the Blazers out of serious contention for a championship, Portland honored Drexler's request to be traded to a contender and sent the Blazer great back home to the Houston Rockets, along with Tracy Murray in exchange for Otis Thorpe, the draft rights of Marcelo Nicola, and a 1995 first-round draft pick in mid-season, right before the trade deadline. Despite finishing the regular season with a record of 47–35, which placed the Rockets 6th out of 8 playoff teams in the Western Conference, Drexler and long-time friend Hakeem Olajuwon helped propel them to an improbable second consecutive championship in 1995. On May 5, during the first round while down two games to one against the Utah Jazz, Drexler led the Rockets in scoring with 41 points while Olajuwon added 40 in a 123–106 win. Houston would go on to win the deciding Game 5, and then also win every remaining elimination game on their postseason run.
In the finals, the Rockets swept the Orlando Magic. In his third and final NBA Finals appearance, Drexler averaged 21.5 points, 9.5 rebounds and 6.8 assists per game.

NBA career statistics

Regular season

|-
| style="text-align:left;"|
| style="text-align:left;"|Portland
| 82 || 3 || 17.2 || .451 || .250 || .728 || 2.9 || 1.9 || 1.3 || .4 || 7.7
|-
| style="text-align:left;"|
| style="text-align:left;"|Portland
| 80 || 43 || 31.9 || .494 || .216 || .759 || 6.0 || 5.5 || 2.2 || .9 || 17.2
|-
| style="text-align:left;"|
| style="text-align:left;"|Portland
| 75 || 58 || 34.3 || .475 || .200 || .769 || 5.6 || 8.0 || 2.6 || .6 || 18.5
|-
| style="text-align:left;"|
| style="text-align:left;"|Portland
| 82 || 82 || 38.0 || .502 || .234 || .760 || 6.3 || 6.9 || 2.5 || .9 || 21.7
|-
| style="text-align:left;"|
| style="text-align:left;"|Portland
| 81 || 80 || 37.8 || .506 || .212 || .811 || 6.6 || 5.8 || 2.5 || .6 || 27.0
|-
| style="text-align:left;"|
| style="text-align:left;"|Portland
| 78 || 78 || 39.3 || .496 || .260 || .799 || 7.9 || 5.8 || 2.7 || .7 || 27.2
|-
| style="text-align:left;"|
| style="text-align:left;"|Portland
| 73 || 73 || 36.8 || .494 || .283 || .774 || 6.9 || 5.9 || 2.0 || .7 || 23.3
|-
| style="text-align:left;"|
| style="text-align:left;"|Portland
| 82 || 82 || 34.8 || .482 || .319 || .794 || 6.7 || 6.0 || 1.8 || .7 || 21.5
|-
| style="text-align:left;"|
| style="text-align:left;"|Portland
| 76 || 76 || 36.2 || .470 || .337 || .794 || 6.6 || 6.7 || 1.8 || .9 || 25.0
|-
| style="text-align:left;"|
| style="text-align:left;"|Portland
| 49 || 49 || 34.1 || .429 || .233 || .839 || 6.3 || 5.7 || 1.9 || .8 || 19.9
|-
| style="text-align:left;"|
| style="text-align:left;"|Portland
| 68 || 68 || 34.3 || .428 || .324 || .777 || 6.5 || 4.9 || 1.4 || .5 || 19.2
|-
| style="text-align:left;"|
| style="text-align:left;"|Portland
| 41 || 41 || 34.8 || .428 || .363 || .835 || 5.7 || 5.1 || 1.8 || .5 || 22.0
|-
| style="text-align:left; background:#afe6ba;"|†
| style="text-align:left;"|Houston
| 35 || 34 || 37.1 || .506 || .357 || .809 || 7.0 || 4.4 || 1.8 || .7 || 21.4
|-
| style="text-align:left;"|
| style="text-align:left;"|Houston
| 52 || 51 || 38.4 || .433 || .332 || .784 || 7.2 || 5.8 || 2.0 || .5 || 19.3
|-
| style="text-align:left;"|
| style="text-align:left;"|Houston
| 62 || 62 || 36.6 || .442 || .355 || .750 || 6.0 || 5.7 || 1.9 || .6 || 18.0
|-
| style="text-align:left;"|
| style="text-align:left;"|Houston
| 70 || 70 || 35.3 || .427 || .317 || .801 || 4.9 || 5.5 || 1.8 || .6 || 18.4
|- class="sortbottom"
| style="text-align:center;" colspan="2"|Career
| 1,086 || 950 || 34.6 || .472 || .318 || .788 || 6.1 || 5.6 || 2.0 || .7 || 20.4
|- class="sortbottom"
| style="text-align:center;" colspan="2"|All-Star
| 9 || 4 || 18.4 || .506 || .286 || 1.000 || 4.9 || 2.6 || 1.3 || .7 || 10.7

Playoffs

|-
| style="text-align:left;"|1984
| style="text-align:left;”|Portland
| 5 ||  || 17.0 || .429 || .000 || .857 || 3.4 || 1.6 || 1.0 || .2 || 7.2
|-
| style="text-align:left;"|1985
| style="text-align:left;”|Portland
| 9 || 9 || 37.7 || .410 || .286 || .844 || 6.1 || 9.2 || 2.6 || 1.0 || 16.7
|-
| style="text-align:left;"|1986
| style="text-align:left;”|Portland
| 4 || 4 || 36.3 || .456 || .400 || .783 || 6.3 || 6.5 || 1.5 || .8 || 18.0
|-
| style="text-align:left;"|1987
| style="text-align:left;”|Portland
| 4 || 4 || 38.3 || .456 || .250 || .793 || 7.5 || 3.8 || 1.8 || .8 || 24.0
|-
| style="text-align:left;"|1988
| style="text-align:left;”|Portland
| 4 || 4 || 42.5 || .386 || .500 || .724 || 7.0 || 5.3 || 3.0 || .5 || 22.0
|-
| style="text-align:left;"|1989
| style="text-align:left;”|Portland
| 3 || 3 || 42.7 || .493 || .000 || .765 || 6.7 || 8.3 || 2.0 || .7 || 27.7
|-
| style="text-align:left;"|1990
| style="text-align:left;”|Portland
| 21 || 21 || 40.6 || .441 || .220 || .774 || 7.2 || 7.1 || 2.5 || .9 || 21.4
|-
| style="text-align:left;"|1991
| style="text-align:left;”|Portland
| 16 || 16 || 39.6 || .476 || .268 || .776 || 8.1 || 8.1 || 2.1 || 1.0 || 21.7
|-
| style="text-align:left;"|1992
| style="text-align:left;”|Portland
| 21 || 21 || 40.3 || .466 || .235 || .807 || 7.4 || 7.0 || 1.5 || 1.0 || 26.3
|-
| style="text-align:left;"|1993
| style="text-align:left;”|Portland
| 3 || 3 || 38.7 || .419 || .417 || .800 || 6.3 || 4.7 || 1.7 || 1.0 || 19.0
|-
| style="text-align:left;"|1994
| style="text-align:left;”|Portland
| 4 || 4 || 39.3 || .425 || .231 || .826 || 10.3 || 5.5 || 2.0 || .5 || 21.0
|-
| style="text-align:left;background:#afe6ba;"|1995†
| style="text-align:left;”|Houston
| 22 || 22 || 38.6 || .481 || .303 || .786 || 7.0 || 5.0 || 1.5 || .7 || 20.5
|-
| style="text-align:left;"|1996
| style="text-align:left;”|Houston
| 8 || 8 || 36.5 || .415 || .265 || .765 || 7.8 || 5.0 || 2.6 || .5 || 16.6
|-
| style="text-align:left;"|1997
| style="text-align:left;”|Houston
| 16 || 16 || 38.9 || .436 || .373 || .778 || 5.6 || 4.8 || 1.6 || .4 || 18.1
|-
| style="text-align:left;"|1998
| style="text-align:left;”|Houston
| 5 || 5 || 36.4 || .309 || .192 || .757 || 5.4 || 4.6 || 1.6 || .6 || 15.0
|- class="sortbottom"
| style="text-align:center;" colspan="2"|Career
| 145 || 140 || 38.4 || .447 || .288 || .787 || 6.9 || 6.1 || 1.9 || .7 || 20.4

Awards
 First-team NCAA All-American (1983)
 Southwest Conference Player of the Year (1983)
 10-time NBA All-Star (1986, 1988–1994, 1996, 1997)
 All-NBA First Team (1992)
 All-NBA Second Team (1988, 1991)
 All-NBA Third Team (1990, 1995)
 Olympic gold medalist (1992)
 NBA championship (1995)
 Named one of the 50 Greatest Players in NBA History (1996)
 Two-time Naismith Memorial Basketball Hall of Fame Inductee
 Oregon Sports Hall of Fame Inducted (2001)
 Named to the NBA 75th Anniversary Team (2021)

NBA records

Regular season
Most steals in a half: 8, second half, Houston Rockets vs. Sacramento Kings, 

Most offensive rebounds by a guard in a career: 2,615
Blocks: 4 vs Utah Jazz May 9, 1991

Playoffs

Most steals in a 3-game series: 13, Portland Trail Blazers vs. Dallas Mavericks, 1990 Western Conference First round

Most steals in a half: 6, Portland Trail Blazers vs. Phoenix Suns,

All-Star Game
Highest free throw percentage for a career: 1.000 (12—12)

Player profile

Clyde "The Glide" Drexler, as he was nicknamed at the University of Houston and throughout his professional career, was famed for his speed and athleticism on the court and his easygoing and quiet demeanor off the court. At the University of Houston, Drexler became well known for his exceptional abilities as a finisher, but generally was not considered a great shooter. During his pro career Drexler developed a much more well-rounded game, even becoming an effective post player and more consistent outside shooter. His extraordinary leaping abilities allowed him to be an acrobatic dunker and Drexler participated in numerous NBA All-Star dunk contests during the late eighties.

Drexler was regarded as a versatile player, and he was consistently among the leaders at his position in points, rebounds, assists, and steals. He also posted a considerable number of blocked shots for a player his size, ranking third for his career totals among guards.

Drexler set a Trail Blazer record in 1989 by dunking on an 11' 1" rim.

As of 2008, Drexler leads all guards with his career average of offensive rebounds with 2.4 per game.

In 2021, to commemorate the NBA's 75th Anniversary The Athletic ranked their top 75 players of all time, and named Drexler as the 43rd greatest player in NBA history.

College coaching career
Drexler stayed with the Rockets for three more seasons before retiring from the NBA after the 1997–98 season in order to become head men's basketball coach at his alma mater, the University of Houston.

Drexler coached the Cougars in the 1998–99 and 1999–2000 seasons. After compiling a 19–39 record in his two seasons, Drexler decided to resign to spend more time with his family.

Head coaching record

Honors

Drexler's No. 22 jersey has been retired by the Cougars (pictured), Rockets, and Trail Blazers. He was inducted as a player into the Naismith Memorial Basketball Hall of Fame on September 10, 2004, in his first year of eligibility. He was named one of the 50 Greatest Players in NBA History in 1996 and named to the league's 75th anniversary team in 2021.

In 2004 Drexler co-authored his biography, Clyde the Glide, with Portland Tribune sports writer Kerry Eggers, and University of Houston classmate and CBS Sports broadcaster Jim Nantz providing the foreword.

Personal life

Drexler married his wife, Gaynell, on December 30, 1988. They divorced in 2011. He has four children: Erica, Austin, Elise, and Adam (the last three with Gaynell). In 2014 Drexler married his second wife, Tonya, whom he had met through fellow NBA star Dominique Wilkins. Drexler has owned homes in the River Oaks–Memorial neighborhood of Houston and in the Dunthorpe suburb of Portland.

His brother James and his two sisters, Denise and Virginia, run the family barbecue restaurants in Houston called Drexler's World Famous BBQ & Grill, which includes the "22 Bar". His mother, Eunice Scott, also works at the downtown restaurant that was started by his uncle in 1967. There are two locations, downtown Houston and Bush Intercontinental Airport. Drexler also started investing in real estate in his rookie NBA season, and although he is now mostly retired, he does do some managing of his Drexler Holdings LLC, based in downtown Houston.

Books
Drexler is the subject of the book Clyde Drexler: Clyde the Glide. He also wrote the introduction to the children's book Shrews Can't Hoop.

TV appearances
Drexler made a guest appearance on Married... with Children, a cameo appearance in an episode of Arliss, and was also a guest star in an episode of The Sentinel. In 2006, he made a cameo appearance in the basketball movie Like Mike 2: Streetball. That same year, Drexler participated in the first season of the Spike TV show Pros vs. Joes, which features three amateur contestants matching themselves against five professional athletes. Drexler was a member of the regular season Green Team and the season finale Orange Team.

On February 21, 2007, it was announced that Drexler would participate in the fourth season of the American version of Dancing with the Stars with partner Elena Grinenko. Drexler was the fourth celebrity to be voted off in round five on April 17, 2007.

On April 11, 2010, Drexler appeared as a guest on NBC's Celebrity Apprentice in which he helped the men's team "Rock Solid" complete a task to create video advertisements for Right Guard.

See also
 List of National Basketball Association career scoring leaders
 List of National Basketball Association career assists leaders
 List of National Basketball Association career steals leaders
 List of National Basketball Association career turnovers leaders
 List of National Basketball Association career free throw scoring leaders
 List of National Basketball Association career playoff scoring leaders
 List of National Basketball Association career playoff assists leaders
 List of National Basketball Association career playoff steals leaders
 List of National Basketball Association career playoff turnovers leaders
 List of National Basketball Association players with 9 or more steals in a game

References

External links

 
 Clyde Drexler at NBA Encyclopedia
 Clyde Drexler at the Basketball Hall of Fame
 
 University of Houston Digital Library photos of Clyde Drexler

1962 births
Living people
African-American basketball players
All-American college men's basketball players
American men's basketball players
Basketball coaches from Louisiana
Basketball coaches from Texas
Basketball players at the 1992 Summer Olympics
Basketball players from New Orleans
Basketball players from Houston
College men's basketball head coaches in the United States
Houston Cougars men's basketball coaches
Houston Cougars men's basketball players
Houston Rockets players
Medalists at the 1992 Summer Olympics
Naismith Memorial Basketball Hall of Fame inductees
National Basketball Association All-Stars
National Basketball Association players with retired numbers
Olympic gold medalists for the United States in basketball
Participants in American reality television series
Portland Trail Blazers draft picks
Portland Trail Blazers players
Shooting guards
Small forwards
Sportspeople from New Orleans
Sportspeople from Houston
United States men's national basketball team players
21st-century African-American people
20th-century African-American sportspeople